Fred, Frederic, Frederick, or Fredrick Davis may refer to:

Sports
 Fred Davis (snooker player) (1913–1998), English billiards and snooker champion
 Fred Davis (footballer, born 1871) (1871–?), English football (soccer) player
 Fred Davis (footballer, born 1913), English football (soccer) player
 Fred Davis (footballer, born 1929) (1929–1996), English football (soccer) player
 Fred Davis (defensive lineman) (1918–1995), American football player
 Fred Davis (tight end) (born 1986), American football player
 Fred Davis (wrestler)

Others
 Fredrick Davis (dancer) (born 1986), African-American ballet dancer
 Fred Davis (entrepreneur) (born 1955), American technology entrepreneur, author, and media executive
 Fred Davis III, American political ad guru
 Fred Davis (politician) (1868–1945), Canadian farmer and politician
 Fred Davis (broadcaster) (1921–1996), Canadian broadcaster
 Frederick W. Davis (1877–1961), operator of antiques and folk art shop in Mexico where Mexican Modern artists met
 Fred Davis (comics), fictional true identity of one of the various characters to use the name Bucky in comic books published by Marvel Comics
 Frederick Curtice Davis (1915–1941), Navy Cross recipient
 Fred Langdon Davis (1868–1951), lawyer and political figure in Manitoba, Canada
 Fred Henry Davis (1894–1937), American lawyer and judge
 Frederick Lewis Davis, Liberal politician in South Wales
 Fred Davis Jr., New Hampshire politician

See also
 Frederick Davies (disambiguation)
 Frederick Davis Shaw (1909–1977), Canadian politician
 Davis (surname)